The 2003–04 season was Galatasaray's 100th in existence and the 46th consecutive season in the Süper Lig. This article shows statistics of the club's players in the season, and also lists all matches that the club have played in the season.

Squad statistics

Transfers

In

Out

Süper Lig

Standings

Türkiye Kupası

Second round

Third round

UEFA Champions League

Third qualifying round

Group stage

UEFA Cup

Third round

Attendance

 Sold season tickets: 38,000

References

Galatasaray S.K. (football) seasons
Galatasaray S.K.
2000s in Istanbul
Galatasaray Sports Club 2003–04 season